The Finance Minister of the Faroe Islands (in Faroese fíggjarmálaráðharrin or landsstýrismaðurin í fíggjarmálum) is an important part of the Faroese cabinet, (Føroya Landsstýri) and of the Faroese economy.

Finance Ministers

Notes and references 

 
Finance